Georges Jean Raymond Pompidou (5 July 19112 April 1974) was a French politician who served as President of France from 1969 until his death in 1974. He previously was Prime Minister of France under President Charles de Gaulle from 1962 to 1968—the longest tenure in the position's history.

In the context of the strong growth of the last years of the Trente Glorieuses, Pompidou continued De Gaulle's policy of modernisation, symbolised by the presidential use of the Concorde, the creation of large industrial groups and the launch of the high-speed train project (TGV). The State invested heavily in the automobile, agri-food, steel, telecommunications, nuclear and aerospace sectors. It also created the minimum wage (SMIC) and the Ministry of the Environment.

His foreign policy, pragmatic although in keeping with the Gaullist principle of French independence, was marked by a warming of relations with Nixon's United States, as well as by close relations with Brezhnev's USSR, the launch of the Snake in the tunnel and the relaunching of European construction by facilitating the United Kingdom's entry into the EEC, in contrast to his predecessor de Gaulle's opposition to it.

Pompidou died in office in 1974 of Waldenström's disease, a rare form of blood cancer. His presidency is generally held in high esteem by French political commentators.

A man of letters, he belongs to a long line of French statesmen with an excellent writing style. His "Anthology of French Poetry" is still a reference today and is part of the school curriculum. While he was passionate about contemporary art, his name remains known worldwide for the Centre national d'art et de culture Georges-Pompidou, which he initiated, which was inaugurated in 1977 and which subsequently spread the name with its branches in Metz (France), Malaga (Spain), Brussels (Belgium) and Shanghai (China). A Georges Pompidou Museum is also dedicated to him in his home town.

Before politics
The family of Georges Pompidou was of very modest origins: he was the grandson of farmers of modest means in Cantal on both his father's and his mother's side. His parents were teachers. Thus his case is often cited as a typical example of social mobility in the Third Republic, thanks to public schooling.

Georges Jean Raymond Pompidou was born on 5 July 1911 in the commune of Montboudif, in the department of Cantal in central France. After his hypokhâgne at Lycée Pierre-de-Fermat and his khâgne at Lycée Louis-le-Grand, where he befriended future Senegalese poet and statesman Léopold Sédar Senghor, he attended the École Normale Supérieure, from which he graduated with a degree of agrégation in literature.

He first taught literature at the lycée Henri IV in Paris until hired in 1953 by Guy de Rothschild to work at Rothschild. In 1956, he was appointed the bank's general manager, a position he held until 1962. Later, he was hired by Charles de Gaulle to manage the Anne de Gaulle Foundation for Down syndrome (de Gaulle's youngest daughter Anne had Down syndrome).

Prime Minister
Jacques Chirac served as an aide to Prime Minister Pompidou and recalled:

{{blockquote|The man gave the appearance of being secretive, wily, a little cunning – which he was, to a degree. However, it was primarily his intelligence, culture, and competence that conferred indisputable authority on him and commanded respect.... I remember his untamed eyebrows, his penetrating, very kindly gaze, his perceptive smile, full of humour and mischievousness, his voice with its wonderful low, warm, gravelly tone, and a figure that was both powerful and elegant. Naturally reserved, little given to emotional outbursts, Pompidou did not forge very close ties with his colleagues.<ref>Jacques Chirac, M Life and Politics" (2011) p 24</ref>}}

He served as prime minister of France under de Gaulle after Michel Debré resigned, from 14 April 1962 to 10 July 1968, and to this day is the longest serving French prime minister under the Fifth Republic. His nomination was controversial because he was not a member of the National Assembly. In October 1962, he was defeated in a vote of no-confidence, but de Gaulle dissolved the National Assembly. The Gaullists won the legislative election and Pompidou was reappointed as Prime Minister. In 1964, he was faced with a miners' strike. He led the 1967 legislative campaign of the Union of Democrats for the Fifth Republic to a narrow victory. Pompidou was widely regarded as being responsible for the peaceful resolution of the student uprising of May 1968. His strategy was to break the coalition of students and workers by negotiating with the trade-unions and employers (Grenelle conference).

However, during the events of May 1968, disagreements arose between Pompidou and de Gaulle. Pompidou did not understand why the President did not inform him of his departure to Baden-Baden on 29 May. Their relationship, until then very good, would be strained from then on. Pompidou led and won the 1968 legislative campaign, overseeing a tremendous victory of the Gaullist Party. He then resigned. Nevertheless, in part due to his actions during the May 1968 crisis, he appeared as the natural successor to de Gaulle. Pompidou announced his candidature for the Presidency in January 1969.

In social policy, Pompidou's tenure as prime minister witnessed the establishment of the National Employment Fund in 1963 to counter the negative effects on employment caused by industrial restructuring.

Presidency
After the failure of the 1969 constitutional referendum, de Gaulle resigned and Pompidou was elected president of France. In the general election of 15 June 1969, he defeated the centrist President of the Senate and Acting President Alain Poher by a wide margin (58%–42%). Though a Gaullist, Pompidou was more pragmatic than de Gaulle, notably facilitating the accession of the United Kingdom to the European Community on 1 January 1973. He embarked on an industrialisation plan and initiated the Arianespace project, as well as the TGV project, and furthered the French civilian nuclear programme. He was sceptical about the "New Society" programme of his prime minister, Jacques Chaban-Delmas. In 1972, he replaced Chaban-Delmas with Pierre Messmer, a more conservative Gaullist. While the left-wing opposition organised itself and proposed a Common Programme before the 1973 legislative election, Pompidou widened his presidential majority by including Centrist pro-European parties. In addition, he paid special attention to regional and local needs in order to strengthen his political party, the UDR (Union des Democrates pour la Ve République), which he made a central and lasting force in the Gaullist movement.

Foreign affairs
The United States was eager to restore positive relations with France after de Gaulle's departure from office. New U.S. President Richard Nixon and his top adviser Henry Kissinger admired Pompidou; the politicians were in agreement on most major policy issues. The United States offered to help the French nuclear programme. Economic difficulties, however, arose following the Nixon Shock and the 1973–75 recession, particularly over the role of the American dollar as the medium for world trade.

Pompidou sought to maintain good relations with the newly independent former French colonies in Africa. In 1971, he visited Mauritania, Senegal, Ivory Coast, Cameroon, and Gabon. He brought a message of cooperation and financial assistance, but without the traditional paternalism. More broadly, he made an effort to foster closer relations with North African and Middle Eastern countries in order to develop a hinterland including all nations bordering the Mediterranean.

Modernising Paris
Pompidou's time in office was marked by constant efforts to modernise France's capital city. He spearheaded construction of a modern art museum, the Centre Beaubourg (renamed Centre Pompidou after his death), on the edge of the Marais area of Paris. Other attempts at modernisation included tearing down the open air markets at Les Halles and replacing them with the shopping mall of the same name, building the Montparnasse Tower, and constructing an expressway on the right bank of the Seine.

Death in office

While still in office, Pompidou died on 2 April 1974, at 9 PM, while in his apartment, from Waldenström macroglobulinemia. His body was buried on 4 April, in the churchyard of Orvilliers, where he had bought an old baker's house which he turned into a weekend home. The official memorial service for him was held at Notre-Dame de Paris with 3000 dignitaries in attendance (including 28 heads of state and representatives from 82 countries). April 6 was declared a national day of mourning and entertainment and cultural events were canceled, theatres and schools closed.

Attendees included:

A controversy arose surrounding the secrecy kept over Pompidou's illness, and the political class "agreed" that future presidents of the Republic would have to provide reports on the state of their health. However, President François Mitterrand, who had pledged during his 1981 campaign to publish regular health bulletins, would also conceal, after his accession to power, the severity of the cancer from which he was suffering.

Pompidou's wife Claude Pompidou would outlive him by more than thirty years. The couple had one (adopted) son, Alain Pompidou, who went on to serve as president of the European Patent Office.

France withdrew from the Eurovision Song Contest 1974, which took place just four days after Pompidou's death, as a mark of respect.

Works
 Anthologie de la Poésie Française, Livre de Poche/Hachette, 1961
 Le Nœud gordien, éd. Plon, 1974
 Entretiens et discours, deux vol., éd. Plon, 1975
 Pour rétablir une vérité, éd. Flammarion, 1982

Medals
 Legion of Honour:
 Chevalier de la Legion of Honour: (France) (1948);
 Officier de la Legion of Honour: (France) (1957);
 Grand-croix de la Legion of Honour: 1969, grand-maître de l'ordre (France) (1969-1974, as president of the republic);
 Grand-croix de l'Ordre national du Mérite (France);
 Grand Cross of Order of St. Olav (Norway) (1962);
 Grand Cordon of Order of Leopold (Belgium).
 Honorary Knight Grand Cross of the Order of the Bath (United Kingdom) (1972)
 Knight Grand Cross with Collar of Order of Merit of the Italian Republic (1973).

 See also 

Centre Georges Pompidou
Lycée Français International Georges Pompidou - A French school in Dubai and Sharjah, United Arab Emirates
 France's neocolonialism

References

Further reading
 Bell, David et al. eds. Biographical Dictionary of French Political Leaders Since 1870 (1990) pp 346–349.
 Bell, David. Presidential Power in Fifth Republic France (2000) pp 105–26.

 Demossier, Marion, et al., eds. The Routledge Handbook of French Politics and Culture'' (Routledge, 2019).

Offices and titles

1911 births
1974 deaths
20th-century presidents of France
20th-century Princes of Andorra
Deaths from cancer in France
Deaths from lymphoma
École Normale Supérieure alumni
Gaullism
French Army personnel of World War II
French Roman Catholics
Lycée Louis-le-Grand alumni
People from Cantal
People of the Cold War
Princes of Andorra
Sciences Po alumni
Lycée Henri-IV teachers
Honorary Knights Grand Cross of the Order of the Bath
French Army officers